J'un Oeil is the title of a 1975 album by the Fusion band Sloche. Highly regarded  by prog fanatics as one of the top albums from Quebec, Canada in the 1970s alongside Si on avait besoin d'une cinquième saison by Harmonium, and Les Porches by Maneige.

"C'pas la fin du Monde"  – 8:45
"Le Karême d'Eros"  – 10:40
"J'un Oeil"  – 4:41 
"Algébrique"  – 6:23
"Potage Aux Herbes Douteuses"  – 7:05

Personnel 
Réjean Yacola - Acoustic and Electric Pianos, Minimoog, Clavinet, Celesta, Vocals
Martin Murray - Hammond B3 Organ, Minimoog, Saxophone, Vocals
Caroll Bérard - Acoustic and Electric Guitars, Vocals
Pierre Hébert - Bass, Vocals
Gilles Chiasson - drums

References

1975 albums
Sloche (band) albums